Ajax High School (AHS) is located in Ajax, Ontario, Canada within the Durham District School Board. It is the largest secondary school in southern Ajax and the fourth-largest in all of Ajax. The school offers a wide range of academic and extracurricular activities. The school also offers a French Immersion program. Ajax High School was given a 5.5 (out of 10) rating in 2012/13 and ranked 478th out of 740 schools across Ontario.

The school was opened in 1956 and has since undergone several large expansions. In the 1960s, a large section that today houses the main office, cafetorium, front entrance, courtyard, as well as several classrooms, was added. Later, in the early 2000s, a wing was added to the east side of the building. Many of these classrooms are now devoted to mathematics and science courses.

See also
List of high schools in Ontario

References

External links 
 Ajax High School
 Ajax Tumblr

High schools in the Regional Municipality of Durham
Ajax, Ontario
1956 establishments in Ontario
Educational institutions established in 1956